John Barr Cavanagh (5 May 1921 – 15 October 2019) was professor of applied neurobiology at the Institute of Neurology in London. He was a founder member of the British Neuropathological Society who award a prize in his memory. A collection of papers relating to his investigations into Minamata disease are held by the Wellcome Library.

Selected publications
 The Brain in Unclassified Mental Retardation. Churchill Livingstone, London, 1972. (Editor)

References

External links 
https://www.semanticscholar.org/author/John-Barr-Cavanagh/2602967

1921 births
2019 deaths
British neuroscientists